Bhai (in English " Brother") is a 1997 Indian Hindi-language gangster drama action film directed by Deepak Shivdasani, and written by Kader Khan. It starred Sunil Shetty, Pooja Batra, Sonali Bendre and Ashish Vidyarthi in lead roles.

The film released on Diwali alongside Shahrukh Khan's Dil To Pagal Hai, Nana Patekar's Ghulam-E-Mustafa 
The movie is a remake of the Telugu movie Anna, starring Rajasekhar, Roja Selvamani and Gautami.

Plot
Tired of facing assaults by the corrupt policemen and lawbreakers in the hilly village areas, Kundan (Sunil Shetty) decides to move to Mumbai with his younger brother Kisna (Kunal Khemu), with the help of honest lawyer Satyaprakash (Om Puri) and his daughters Pooja (Pooja Batra) and Meenu (Sonali Bendre). Kundan soon gets a job as an auto driver, and begins to send Kisna to school. Soon they change their lifestyle and become city dwellers. Don David (Ashish Vidyarthi) and Malik (Rajendra Gupta) are arch rivals in the city, struggling to come to power, and corrupt minister Mantri tries to support both for his own profit.

Satyaprakash is murdered by David's men. Kundan's brother Kisna witnesses David murdering Satyaprakash, and he tells Kundan. When David finds out that Kisna will tell the police, he sends his men to murder Kisna, killing him. An angry and devastated Kundan seeks revenge. He sets out and murders the don's men one after the other. He is supported by honest cop Inspector Lalit Kapoor (Kader Khan) and the entire locality, including friends (Shakti Kapoor). He does not even acknowledge Malik when he comes to him to support him.

Soon Kundan becomes "Bhai", a don who is loved and respected by all. He marries Pooja and they have a son whom they name Kisna. But Pooja is not happy with Kundan's activities, as she feels it can harm both him and his family. Kundan is joined by Meenu in all his activities. Enemies never at bay for those who take the gun, Mantri gets Inspector Lalit transferred to another area. Malik and David now team up along with Mantri to eliminate Kundan. On one occasion, when Kisna is taken to hospital by Kundan's friends and Meenu, all of them are attacked and murdered, but not before Ganesh (Mohan Joshi) manages to save Kisna and bring him to Kundan.

Kundan is arrested on false charges of murder. His enemies conspire to take him to the hills and eliminate him, coincidentally, at the very jungles from which Kundan first came. Kundan breaks away in the police jeep which the villains immolate, and drives it through the waterfalls in the jungle, into the river. Malik, David, Mantri and the other corrupt cops set out in search of Kundan, unfortunately for them, Lalit arrives as the inspector in charge of the area. He helps Kundan by shooting his handcuffs. Kundan takes on all the goons in the jungle he knows so well, eliminating them one by one, even blasting the helicopter carrying Mantri trying to shoot him down. After all is over, he surrenders to Lalit.

The film ends with Lalit and Kundan arriving back at home and a happy reunion.

Cast
Suniel Shetty as Kundan
Sonali Bendre as Meenu 
Pooja Batra as Pooja
Om Puri as Advocate Satyaprakash
Kader Khan as Inspector Lalit Kapoor
Shakti Kapoor as Bharat (the postman)
Kunal Khemu as Kisna 
Ashish Vidyarthi as David
Lalita Pawar as Satyaprakash's mother
Ishrat Ali as Mantri
Rajendra Gupta as Malik
Mohan Joshi as Ganesh
Mushtaq Khan as a Principal
Deepak Shirke as Inspector Khare

Soundtracks
Anand-Milind and Sameer teamed up yet again with director Deepak Shivdasani after composing successful songs in films like Pehchaan (1993) and Gopi Kishan (1994).

Track Lists

External links
 

1997 films
1990s Hindi-language films
Hindi remakes of Telugu films
Films scored by Anand–Milind
Films directed by Deepak Shivdasani
Indian action drama films